America B.C.: Ancient Settlers in the New World is a 1976 reference work by Barry Fell that tries to establish that North America was visited by many different European Bronze Age cultures long before either Leif Ericsson or Christopher Columbus.

Publication history and description
America B.C.: Ancient Settlers in the New World was published in 1976.  In the book, Barry Fell makes the argument that both archaeological discoveries in North America and examination of North American native languages such as Miꞌkmaq reveal possible links to Bronze Age European cultures, which would point to trans-Atlantic voyages by these cultures millennia before the "discovery" of North American by either 10th-century Vikings or 15th-century Spaniards.

Reception
In the August 1979 issue of Dragon (Issue #28), Paul Karlsson Johnstone found Fell's theories to be cogent and well-reasoned, calling the book "epochal", although he admitted that it contained "debatable statements". Johnstone concluded that Fell's work opened "a portal into what seemed to be a lost world."

However, most of the scientific world rejected Fell's work as pseudoscience. In 1978, Ives Goddard and William W. Fitzhugh of the Department of Anthropology at the Smithsonian Institution stated that "the arguments of America B. C. are unconvincing.  The only accepted case of pre-Columbian European contact in North America remains the Norse site of L'Anse aux Meadows in northern Newfoundland.  Perhaps some day credible proof of other early European contacts will be discovered in the New World. However, America B.C. does not contain such proof and does not employ the standard linguistic and archeological methods that would be necessary to convince specialists in these fields."

References

Reference works